The episodes of the Japanese anime series Gintama were animated by Sunrise. The first 99 episodes were directed by Shinji Takamatsu. Episodes 100 to 105 were directed by Takamatsu and Yoichi Fujita, while following episodes only by Fujita. It premiered on TV Tokyo on April 4, 2006, and finished on March 25, 2010 with a total of 201 episodes. The anime is based on Hideaki Sorachi's manga of the same name. The story revolves around an eccentric samurai, Gintoki Sakata, his apprentice, Shinpachi Shimura, and a teenage alien girl named Kagura. All three are freelancers who search for work in order to pay the monthly rent, which usually goes unpaid anyway.

In Japan, Aniplex distributes the anime in DVD format. A total of thirteen volumes were released for the first season, between  July 26, 2006 and June 26, 2007. The second season was released over another set of thirteen volumes between July 25, 2007 and July 23, 2008. Season 3 was released in thirteen volumes from August 27, 2008 to August 26, 2009. The fourth season was collected in thirteen DVD volumes from October 28, 2009 to October 27, 2010. Prior to the series' premier, an original video animation (OVA) of Gintama by Sunrise was showing at Jump Festa Anime Tour in 2005. A ten-minute long OVA named , set in the war between aliens and samurais, was shown in Jump Festa 2008. On September 30, 2009, it was published a DVD named Gintama Jump Anime Tour 2008 & 2005 which contains the 2005 and 2008 OVAs.

On January 8, 2009, the streaming video service Crunchyroll began offering English subtitled episodes of the series. On the same day, Crunchyroll also began uploading episodes from the beginning of the series at a rate of two a week. The anime is licensed by Sentai Filmworks, with distribution from Section23 Films. Section23 Films' Chris Oarr commented that only the first two seasons were licensed, with an option on the rest. The first collection containing thirteen English-subtitled episodes was released on DVD on April 27, 2010.

While the original anime series ended with the fourth season, a sequel series, titled Gintama and directed by Yoichi Fujita, began airing on April 4, 2011 and concluded on March 28, 2013 after sixty-four episodes. A third anime series, Gintama°, was produced by BN Pictures with Chizuru Miyawaki directing. This series lasted fifty-one episodes and was broadcast from on April 8, 2015 to March 30, 2016.

The latest anime season, Gintama. Shirogane no Tamashii-hen, premiered on January 7, 2018 and ended on October 7, 2018 after twenty-six episodes.

Series overview

Episode list

Season 1 Year-1 (2006–07)

Season 2 (2007–08)

Season 3 (2008–09)

Season 4 (2009–2010)

Gintama''' (2011–12)===

===Gintama': Enchōsen (2012–13)===

===Gintama° (2015–16)===

===Gintama (2017)===

===Gintama. Porori-hen (2017)===

===Gintama. Shirogane no Tamashii-hen'' (2018)

Gintama°: Love Incense Arc (OVA)

Gintama: The Semi-Final (Special)

Jump Festa Specials

References
 General

 Specific

Gintama